Phantom Power is a 1991 album by Rick Wakeman.  It was written as a modern soundtrack for a re-release of the 1925 silent film The Phantom of the Opera.

Track listing 
 "The Visit"
 "Heaven"
 "The Rat"
 "The Stiff"
 "Evil Love"
 "The Voice of Love"
 "Heat of the Moment"
 "Fear of Love"
 "The Love Trilogy"
 "The Hangman"
 "The Sand Dance"
 "You Can't Buy Me Love"
 "Phantom Power"
 "Rock Pursuit"

Personnel 
Rick Wakeman - keyboards
Ashley Holt - vocals
Chrissie Hammond - vocals
D'zal Martin - guitar
Ramon Remedios - tenor vocals
Tony Fernandez - drums, percussion

References

External links
Rick Wakeman's Communication Centre (RWCC)
Phantom Power info at RWCC

Rick Wakeman albums
1990 soundtrack albums
Film soundtracks
Alternative versions of soundtracks